The Ambassador of Sweden to the United Kingdom is in charge of the Sweden's diplomatic mission to the United Kingdom.

1558–1561 Dionysius Beurraeus
1629–1632 Jakob Spens
1656–1657 Krister Bonde
.1672–1691 Johan Barckmann, Baron Leijonbergh
1703–1710 Christoffer Leijoncrona
1710–1717 Carl Gyllenborg
1764–1793 Gustaf Adam von Nolcken
1793–1795 Lars von Engeström
1818–1820 Martin von Wahrendorff
1818–1828 Gustaf Algernon Stierneld
1890–1895 Henrik Åkerman
1895–1902 Count Carl Lewenhaupt
1902–1905 Carl Bildt
1906–1920 Herman Wrangel
1920–1937 Erik Palmstierna
1938–1947 Björn Prytz
1947–1948 Erik Boheman
1948–1967 Gunnar Hägglöf
1967–1972 Leif Belfrage 
1977–1979 Olof Rydbeck 
1979–1982 Per Lind
1982–1991 Leif Leifland
1991–1994 Lennart Eckerberg
1995–1996 Lars-Åke Nilsson
1997–2004 Mats Bergqvist
2004–2010 Staffan Carlsson
2010–2016 Nicola Clase
2016–2021 Torbjörn Sohlström
2021–present Mikaela Kumlin Granit

See also 
Diplomatic missions of Sweden

External links 
Embassy of Sweden in London, official website

United Kingdom
Sweden